Thomas Knox, 1st Viscount Northland (20 April 1729 – 5 November 1818), known as The Lord Welles between 1781 and 1791, was an Irish politician.

Background
Thomas Knox was the son of Thomas Knox and Hester Echlin. He died on 5 November 1818 aged 89.

Political career
Knox was Member of Parliament in the Irish House of Commons for Dungannon from 1755 until 1781. In 1781, he was elevated to the Peerage of Ireland as Baron Welles, of Dungannon in the County of Tyrone.

In 1791 Knox was ennobled as Viscount Northland, of Dungannon in the County of Tyrone. With the Act of Union and the abolition of the Irish Parliament in 1800, he became one of the 28 original Irish Representative Peers in the British House of Lords from then until his death.

About that time he was also appointed Custos Rotulorum of Tyrone.

Family
Knox married Anne Vesey, daughter of John Vesey, 1st Baron Knapton and Elizabeth Brownlow in 1753. They had seven children:
 Thomas Knox, 1st Earl of Ranfurly (1754–1840)
 Maj.-Gen. John Knox (1758–1800)
 Vesey Knox (1760–1830)
 William Knox (1762–1831), Bishop of Derry
 George Knox (1765–1827), MP for Dublin University
 Charles Knox (1770–1825), Archdeacon of Armagh
 Edmund Knox (1772–1849), Bishop of Limerick

References

External links 
 Public Records Office of Northern Ireland

|-

1729 births
1818 deaths
Irish MPs 1727–1760
Irish MPs 1761–1768
Irish MPs 1769–1776
Irish MPs 1776–1783
Irish representative peers
Members of the Parliament of Ireland (pre-1801) for County Tyrone constituencies
Viscounts in the Peerage of Ireland
Members of the Irish House of Lords
Peers of Ireland created by George III